is a Japanese professional footballer who plays as a right back for Tokushima Vortis, on loan from Cerezo Osaka.

References

External links

1996 births
Living people
Japanese footballers
Association football defenders
Albirex Niigata players
J2 League players